A guillotine is an apparatus designed for efficiently carrying out executions by beheading. The device consists of a tall, upright frame with a weighted and angled blade suspended at the top. The condemned person is secured with a pillory at the bottom of the frame, holding the position of the neck directly below the blade. The blade is then released, swiftly and forcefully decapitating the victim with a single, clean pass; the head falls into a basket or other receptacle below.

The guillotine is best known for its use in France, particularly during the French Revolution, where the revolution's supporters celebrated it as the people's avenger and the revolution's opponents vilified it as the pre-eminent symbol of the violence of the Reign of Terror. While the name "guillotine" itself dates from this period, similar devices had been in use elsewhere in Europe over several centuries. Use of an oblique blade and the pillory-like restraint device set this type of guillotine apart from others. Display of severed heads had long been one of the most common ways European sovereigns exhibited their power to their subjects.

The design of the guillotine was intended to make capital punishment more reliable and less painful in accordance with new Enlightenment ideas of human rights. Prior to use of the guillotine, France had inflicted manual beheading and a variety of methods of execution, many of which were more gruesome and required a high level of precision and skill to carry out successfully. After its adoption, the device remained France's standard method of judicial execution until abolition of capital punishment in 1981. The last person to be executed in France was Hamida Djandoubi, guillotined on 10 September 1977.

History

Precursors

The use of beheading machines in Europe long predates such use during the French Revolution in 1792. An early example of the principle is found in the High History of the Holy Grail, dated to about 1210. Although the device is imaginary, its function is clear. The text says:

The blade was an axe head weighing 3.5 kg (7.7 lb), attached to the bottom of a massive wooden block that slid up and down in grooves in the uprights. It is not known when the Halifax Gibbet was first used; the first recorded execution in Halifax dates from 1280, but that execution may have been by sword, axe, or gibbet. The machine remained in use until Oliver Cromwell forbade capital punishment for petty theft.

A Hans Weiditz (1495-1537) woodcut illustration from the 1532 edition of Petrarch's De remediis utriusque fortunae, or "Remedies for Both Good and Bad Fortune" shows a device similar to the Halifax Gibbet in the background being used for an execution.

Holinshed's Chronicles of 1577 included a picture of "The execution of Murcod Ballagh near Merton in Ireland in 1307" showing a similar execution machine, suggesting its early use in Ireland.

The Maiden was constructed in 1564 for the Provost and Magistrates of Edinburgh, and was in use from April 1565 to 1710. One of those executed was James Douglas, 4th Earl of Morton, in 1581, and a 1644 publication began circulating the legend that Morton himself commissioned the Maiden after he had seen the Halifax Gibbet. The Maiden was readily dismantled for storage and transport, and it is now on display in the National Museum of Scotland.

France

Etymology 
For a period of time after its invention, the guillotine was called a louisette. However, it was later named after French physician and Freemason Joseph-Ignace Guillotin, who proposed on 10 October 1789 the use of a special device to carry out executions in France in a more humane manner. A death penalty opponent, he was displeased with the breaking wheel and other common, more grisly methods of execution and sought to persuade Louis XVI of France to implement a less painful alternative. While not the device's inventor, Guillotin's name ultimately became an eponym for it. Contrary to popular myth, Guillotin did not die by guillotine but rather by natural causes.

Invention 
French surgeon and physiologist Antoine Louis, together with German engineer , built a prototype for the guillotine. According to the memoires of the French executioner Charles-Henri Sanson, Louis XVI suggested the use of a straight, angled blade instead of a curved one.

Introduction in France 

On 10 October 1789, physician Joseph-Ignace Guillotin proposed to the National Assembly that capital punishment should always take the form of decapitation "by means of a simple mechanism".

Sensing the growing discontent, Louis XVI banned the use of the breaking wheel. In 1791, as the French Revolution progressed, the National Assembly researched a new method to be used on all condemned people regardless of class, consistent with the idea that the purpose of capital punishment was simply to end life rather than to inflict unnecessary pain.

A committee formed under Antoine Louis, physician to the King and Secretary to the Academy of Surgery. Guillotin was also on the committee. The group was influenced by beheading devices used elsewhere in Europe, such as the Italian Mannaia (or Mannaja, which had been used since Roman times), the Scottish Maiden, and the Halifax Gibbet (3.5 kg). While many of these prior instruments crushed the neck or used blunt force to take off a head, a number of them also used a crescent blade to behead and a hinged two-part yoke to immobilize the victim's neck.

Laquiante, an officer of the Strasbourg criminal court, designed a beheading machine and employed Tobias Schmidt, a German engineer and harpsichord maker, to construct a prototype. Antoine Louis is also credited with the design of the prototype. France's official executioner, Charles-Henri Sanson, claimed in his memoirs that King Louis XVI (an amateur locksmith) recommended that the device employ an oblique blade rather than a crescent one, lest the blade not be able to cut through all necks; the neck of the king, who himself died by guillotine years later, was offered up discreetly as an example. The first execution by guillotine was performed on a highwayman Nicolas Jacques Pelletier on 25 April 1792 in front of what is now the city hall of Paris (Place de l'Hôtel de Ville). All citizens condemned to die were from then on executed there, until the scaffold was moved on 21 August to the Place du Carrousel.

The machine was judged successful because it was considered a humane form of execution in contrast with more cruel methods used in the pre-revolutionary Ancien Régime. In France, before the invention of the guillotine, members of the nobility were beheaded with a sword or an axe, which often took two or more blows to kill the condemned. The condemned or their families would sometimes pay the executioner to ensure that the blade was sharp in order to achieve a quick and relatively painless death. Commoners were usually hanged, which could take many minutes. In the early phase of the French Revolution before the guillotine's adoption, the slogan À la lanterne (in English: To the lamp post! String Them Up! or Hang Them!) symbolized popular justice in revolutionary France. The revolutionary radicals hanged officials and aristocrats from street lanterns and also employed more gruesome methods of execution, such as the wheel or burning at the stake.

Having only one method of civil execution for all regardless of class was also seen as an expression of equality among citizens. The guillotine was then the only civil legal execution method in France until abolition of the death penalty in 1981, apart from certain crimes against the security of the state, or for the death sentences passed by military courts, which entailed execution by firing squad.

Reign of Terror 

Louis Collenot d'Angremont was a royalist famed for having been the first guillotined for his political ideas, on 21 August 1792. During the Reign of Terror (June 1793 to July 1794) about 17,000 people were guillotined, including former King Louis XVI and Queen Marie Antoinette who were executed at the guillotine in 1793. Towards the end of the Terror in 1794, revolutionary leaders such as Georges Danton, Saint-Just and Maximilien Robespierre were sent to the guillotine. Most of the time, executions in Paris were carried out in the Place de la Revolution (former Place Louis XV and current Place de la Concorde); the guillotine stood in the corner near the Hôtel Crillon where the City of Brest Statue can be found today. The machine was moved several times, to the Place de la Nation and the Place de la Bastille, but returned, particularly for the execution of the King and for Robespierre.

For a time, executions by guillotine were a popular form of entertainment that attracted great crowds of spectators, with vendors selling programs listing the names of the condemned. But more than being popular entertainment alone during the Terror, the guillotine symbolized revolutionary ideals: equality in death equivalent to equality before the law; open and demonstrable revolutionary justice; and the destruction of privilege under the Ancien Régime, which used separate forms of execution for nobility and commoners. The Parisian sans-culottes, then the popular public face of lower-class patriotic radicalism, thus considered the guillotine a positive force for revolutionary progress.

Retirement 

After the French Revolution, executions resumed in the city center. On 4 February 1832, the guillotine was moved behind the Church of Saint-Jacques-de-la-Boucherie, before being moved again, to the Grande Roquette prison, on 29 November 1851.

In the late 1840s, the Tussaud brothers Joseph and Francis, gathering relics for Madame Tussauds wax museum, visited the aged Henry-Clément Sanson, grandson of the executioner Charles-Henri Sanson, from whom they obtained parts, the knife and lunette, of one of the original guillotines used during the Reign of Terror. The executioner had "pawned his guillotine, and got into woeful trouble for alleged trafficking in municipal property".

On 6 August 1909, the guillotine was used at the junction of the Boulevard Arago and the Rue de la Santé, behind the La Santé Prison.

The last public guillotining in France was of Eugen Weidmann, who was convicted of six murders. He was beheaded on 17 June 1939 outside the prison Saint-Pierre, rue Georges Clemenceau 5 at Versailles, which is now the Palais de Justice. Numerous issues with the proceedings arose: inappropriate behavior by spectators, incorrect assembly of the apparatus, and secret cameras filming and photographing the execution from several storeys above. In response, the French government ordered that future executions be conducted in the prison courtyard in private.

The guillotine remained the official method of execution in France until the death penalty was abolished in 1981. The final three guillotinings in France before its abolition were those of child-murderers Christian Ranucci (on 28 July 1976) in Marseille, Jérôme Carrein (on 23 June 1977) in Douai and torturer-murderer Hamida Djandoubi (on 10 September 1977) in Marseille. Djandoubi's death was the last time that the guillotine was used for an execution by any government.

Germany 
In Germany, the guillotine is known as the Fallbeil ("falling hatchet") or Köpfsmaschine ("head [cutting] machine") and was used in various German states from the 19th century onwards, becoming the preferred method of execution in Napoleonic times in many parts of the country. The guillotine and the firing squad were the legal methods of execution during the era of the German Empire (1871–1918) and the Weimar Republic (1919–1933).

The original German guillotines resembled the French Berger 1872 model, but they eventually evolved into sturdier and more efficient machines. Built primarily of metal instead of wood, these new guillotines had heavier blades than their French predecessors and thus could use shorter uprights as well. Officials could also conduct multiple executions faster, thanks to a more efficient blade recovery system and the eventual removal of the tilting board (bascule). Those deemed likely to struggle were backed slowly into the device from behind a curtain to prevent them from seeing it prior to the execution. A metal screen covered the blade as well in order to conceal it from the sight of the condemned.

Nazi Germany used the guillotine between 1933 and 1945 to execute 16,500 prisoners – 10,000 of them in 1944 and 1945 alone. Notable political victims executed by the guillotine under the Nazi government included Marinus van der Lubbe, a Dutch communist blamed for the Reichstag fire and executed via  guillotine in January 1934. The Nazi government also guillotined Sophie Scholl, who was convicted of high treason after distributing anti-Nazi pamphlets at the University of Munich with her brother Hans, and other members of the German student resistance group, the White Rose. The guillotine was last used in West Germany in 1949 in the execution of Richard Schuh and was last used in East Germany in 1966 in the execution of Horst Fischer. The Stasi used the guillotine in East Germany between 1950 and 1966 for secret executions.

Elsewhere 

A number of countries, primarily in Europe, continued to employ this method of execution into the 19th and 20th centuries, but they ceased to use it before France did in 1977.

In Antwerp, the last person to be beheaded was Francis Kol. Convicted of robbery and murder, he received his punishment on 8 May 1856. During the period from 19 March 1798 to 30 March 1856, there were 19 beheadings in Antwerp.

In Switzerland, it was used for the last time by the canton of Obwalden in the execution of murderer Hans Vollenweider in 1940.

In Greece, the guillotine (along with the firing squad) was introduced as a method of execution in 1834; it was last used in 1913.

In Sweden, beheading became the mandatory method of execution in 1866. The guillotine replaced manual beheading in 1903, and it was used only once, in the execution of murderer Alfred Ander in 1910 at Långholmen Prison, Stockholm. Ander was also the last person to be executed in Sweden before capital punishment was abolished there in 1921.

In South Vietnam, after the Diệm regime enacted the 10/59 Decree in 1959, mobile special military courts were dispatched to the countryside in order to intimidate the rural population; they used guillotines, which had belonged to the former French colonial power, in order to carry out death sentences on the spot. One such guillotine is still on show at the War Remnants Museum in Ho Chi Minh City.

In the Western Hemisphere, the guillotine saw only limited use. The only recorded guillotine execution in North America north of the Caribbean took place on the French island of St. Pierre in 1889, of Joseph Néel, with a guillotine brought in from Martinique. In the Caribbean, it was used quite rarely in Guadeloupe and Martinique, the last time in Fort-de-France in 1965. In South America, the guillotine was only used in French Guiana, where about 150 people were beheaded between 1850 and 1945: most of them were convicts exiled from France and incarcerated within the "bagne", or penal colonies. Within the Southern Hemisphere, it worked in New Caledonia (which had a bagne too until the end of the 19th century) and at least twice in Tahiti.

In 1996 in the United States, Georgia State Representative Doug Teper unsuccessfully sponsored a bill to replace that state's electric chair with the guillotine.

In recent years, a limited number of individuals have died by suicide using a guillotine which they had constructed themselves.

Controversy 

Ever since the guillotine's first use, there has been debate as to whether or not the guillotine provided as swift and painless a death as Guillotin had hoped. With previous methods of execution that were intended to be painful, few expressed concern about the level of suffering that they inflicted. However, because the guillotine was invented specifically to be more humane, the issue of whether or not the condemned experiences pain has been thoroughly examined and has remained a controversial topic. While certain eyewitness accounts of guillotine executions suggest anecdotally that awareness may persist momentarily after decapitation, there has never been true scientific consensus on the matter.

Living heads 
The question of consciousness or awareness following decapitation remained a topic of discussion during the guillotine's use.

The following report was written by Dr. Beaurieux, who observed the head of executed prisoner Henri Languille, on 28 June 1905:

Names for the guillotine 
During the span of its usage, the French guillotine has gone by many names, some of which include:

 La Monte-à-regret (The Regretful Climb)
 Le Rasoir National (The National Razor)
 Le Vasistas or La Lucarne (The Fanlight)
 La Veuve (The Widow)
 Le Moulin à Silence (The Silence Mill)
 Louisette or Louison (from the name of prototype designer Antoine Louis)
 Madame La Guillotine
 Mirabelle (from the name of Mirabeau)
 La Bécane (The Machine)
 Le Massicot (The Paper Trimmer)
 La Cravate à Capet (Capet's Necktie, Capet being Louis XVI)
 La Raccourcisseuse Patriotique (The Patriotic Shortener)
 La demi-lune (The Half-Moon)
 Les Bois de Justice (Timbers of Justice)
 La Bascule à Charlot (Charlot's Rocking-chair)
 Le Prix Goncourt des Assassins (The Goncourt Prize for Murderers)

See also 

 Bals des victimes
 Capital punishment in France
 Halifax Gibbet
 Henri Désiré Landru
 Rozalia Lubomirska
 Marcel Petiot
 Plötzensee Prison
 Jozef Raskin
 Use of capital punishment by nation
 Eugen Weidmann

References

Further reading 
 Carlyle, Thomas. The French Revolution in Three Volumes, Volume 3: The Guillotine. Charles C. Little and James Brown (Little Brown). New York, NY, 1839. No ISBN. (First Edition. Many reprintings of this important history have been done during the last two centuries.)

External links 

The Guillotine Headquarters with a gallery, history, name list, and quiz.
 Bois de justice History of the guillotine, construction details, with rare photos 
 
 Does the head remain briefly conscious after decapitation (revisited)? (from The Straight Dope)
Scientific American, "The Origin of the Guillotine", 17 December 1881, pp. 392.

 
French inventions
Capital punishment in France
Execution equipment
1789 introductions
Blade weapons
18th-century inventions
Decapitation